Kuhbijar (also Romanized as Kūhbījār) is a village in Layl Rural District, in the Central District of Lahijan County, Gilan Province, Iran. At the 2006 census, its population was 716, in 206 families.

References 

Populated places in Lahijan County